The Taft Theatre is a 2,500-seat theater, located in Cincinnati, Ohio. The theatre was built in 1928, as evidenced by its Art Deco interior.

All seats are unobstructed, giving every seat a clear view of the stage. It is part of the Masonic Temple Building at Fifth and Sycamore streets. It is home to The Children Theatre of Cincinnati.

As of 2010, it is operated by Music & Event Management Inc., a subsidiary of Cincinnati Symphony Orchestra. Music & Event Management Inc. also operates Riverbend Music Center and PNC Pavilion.

The theatre underwent $3 million worth of upgrades and renovations for air conditioning, seating, restroom improvements and other amenities.

It is used for Broadway shows, concerts, comedy and other special events.

The theatre played host to the politically motivated Vote for Change Tour on October 2, 2004, featuring performances by Keb' Mo', Bonnie Raitt and Jackson Browne.

External links
Concert Calendar

References

Singer, Allen J. (2005), Stepping Out in Cincinnati: Queen City Entertainment 1900-1960, Charleston: Arcadia Publishing, 

Theatres in Cincinnati
Concert halls in Ohio
Music venues in Cincinnati
Art Deco architecture in Ohio
Theatres completed in 1928
Music venues completed in 1928
1928 establishments in Ohio